The following highways are numbered 835:

Ireland
 R835 regional road

United States
  Maryland Route 835
  Ohio State Route 835
  Puerto Rico Highway 835